Forget about it (catchphrase) associated with the American mafia
Forget About It, eighth studio album by Alison Krauss
Forget About It (film), 2006 film

See also
Fugget About It, 2012 adult animated TV sitcom 
"Let's Forget About It", song by Lisa Loeb from her 1997 album Firecracker
Forget it (disambiguation)